Motir (also Romanized as Moṭīr; also known as Moţer) is a village in Hoveyzeh Rural District, in the Central District of Hoveyzeh County, Khuzestan Province, Iran. At the 2006 census, its population was 144, in 22 families.

References 

Populated places in Hoveyzeh County